Covo is a comune (municipality) in the Province of Bergamo in the Italian region of Lombardy, located about  east of Milan and about  southeast of Bergamo.

Covo borders the following municipalities : Antegnate, Barbata, Calcio, Cortenuova, Fara Olivana con Sola, Isso, Romano di Lombardia.

Demographic evolution

References